The 2024 North Carolina lieutenant gubernatorial election will be held on November 5, 2024, to elect the Lieutenant Governor of North Carolina, concurrently with the 2024 U.S. presidential election, as well as elections to the United States Senate, elections to the United States House of Representatives, and various other state and local elections. Incumbent Republican Governor Mark Robinson is eligible to seek re-election to a second term in office, but has expressed interest in running for governor.

Republican primary

Candidates

Declared
Peter Boykin, political commentator and president of Gays for Trump
Jim Kee, former Greensboro city councilor
Allen Mashburn, pastor
Hal Weatherman, businessman and former chief of staff to former lieutenant governor Dan Forest

Potential
Mark Robinson, incumbent lieutenant governor

Democratic primary

Candidates

Declared
Delmonte Crawford, civil rights activist
Rachel Hunt, state senator from the 42nd district and daughter of former Governor Jim Hunt
Chris Rey, former mayor of Spring Lake and candidate for U.S. Senate in 2016
Raymond Smith Jr., former state representative from the 21st district

References

2024
Governor
North Carolina